Zarbdor is a district of Jizzakh Region in Uzbekistan. The capital lies at the town Zarbdor.

The district consists of 4 urban-type settlements (Zarbdor, Boʻston, Fayzobod, Sharq yulduzi) and 8 rural communities.

References 

Districts of Uzbekistan
Jizzakh Region